The International Association of Ports and Harbors (IAPH) is the global trade association for seaports worldwide.

It is headquartered in Tokyo, Japan. Formed in 1955, it is now recognised as the NGO representing ports worldwide. With over 200 ports in membership, as well as numerous national port representative bodies, it now has consultative status with 5 UN agencies, including UNCTAD and the IMO.

Structure

Membership
The IAPH membership is divided into 3 regions, African/European, American and Asian/Oceanian.

Secretariat
The Secretariat is based in Tokyo and is headed by a Secretary General who is appointed by the Board of Directors.

References

External links
Official website

Trade associations based in Japan
Maritime organizations
Transport organizations based in Japan
International trade organizations
International organizations based in Japan